42nd Division or 42nd Infantry Division may refer to:

Infantry divisions
 42. Home Guard Infantry Division, a unit of the Croatian Army
 42nd Division (German Empire), a unit of the Imperial German Army
 42nd (East Lancashire) Division, a unit of the British Army
 42nd Infantry Division (United States), a unit of the United States Army's New York Army National Guard
 42nd Rifle Division (Soviet Union)
 42nd Guards Motor Rifle Division, currently a formation of the Russian Ground Forces
 42nd Division (Imperial Japanese Army), a unit of the Imperial Japanese Army during WW2
 42nd Division (Spain)

Armoured divisions
 42nd Armoured Division (United Kingdom), a unit of the British Army

Aviation divisions
 42d Air Division, a unit of the United States Air Force

See also
 42nd Group (disambiguation)
 42nd Brigade (disambiguation)
 42nd Regiment (disambiguation)
 42nd Battalion (disambiguation)
 42nd Squadron (disambiguation)